Linden is a historic mansion in Natchez, Mississippi.

Location
It is located at 1 Linden Place in Natchez, Adams County, Mississippi.

History

The mansion was originally built in 1785, and records have been found going back to 1790.

In 1815, it was rebuilt for Thomas Buck Reed (1787–1829), who served as the United States Senator from Mississippi from January 28, 1826, to March 4, 1827, and again from March 4, 1829, to November 26, 1829; he was also the son-in-law of plantation owner Isaac Ross (1760–1838). The mansion was known as Reedland.

It was then purchased by Dr. John Ker (1789–1850), another plantation owner who knew Isaac Ross through the Mississippi Colonization Society. Ker expanded the mansion by adding the wings and a ninety-eight-foot gallery.

Shortly after he died, it became the residence of Jane Conner and her seven children. She added a two-story brick wing.

It was added to the National Register of Historic Places on September 1, 1978. It now used as a hotel.

Architecture
The house has two stories, with an apartment on each wing. The front porch has a wide gallery with white columns. Inside, there is a painting by John James Audubon (1785–1851), and a portrait of Swedish opera singer Jenny Lind (1820–1887).

References

External links

Houses on the National Register of Historic Places in Mississippi
Federal architecture in Mississippi
Houses completed in 1785
Houses in Natchez, Mississippi
National Register of Historic Places in Natchez, Mississippi